Beit David  was the fourth Jewish neighborhood outside the walls of Jerusalem. This courtyard neighborhood was established in 1873.

History
Beit David was founded as an almshouse for Jews on a plot of land donated by a kollel. It was named for the philanthropist, David Reis. The name also alludes to the historical House of David and to the book known as Beit David, a treatise on Jewish law written by Joseph Ben David in the 18th century. Because Beit David was far from the kollel's center in the Old City, it contained a synagogue and  10 apartments to ensure the existence of a minyan.
 
The residence of Abraham Isaac Kook, Israel's first Askenanzic chief rabbi was on the second floor of the building, added in 1922. The Rabbi Kook House is now a museum of the life of Rabbi Kook. The Museum of Psalms, located on the ground floor for many years, featured the paintings of Moshe Tzvi HaLevi Berger, a Kabbalist and painter. Berger was evicted in 2014 to make room for a yeshiva

See also
Expansion of Jerusalem in the 19th century

References

Neighbourhoods of Jerusalem